Melaleuca sheathiana, commonly known as boree is a plant in the myrtle family, Myrtaceae, and is endemic to central and south-western Western Australia. It is similar to Melaleuca pauperiflora except that it has small, spoon-shaped leaves.

Description

The stamens are arranged in five bundles around the flower and there are 9 to 14 stamens per bundle.

Taxonomy and naming
Melaleuca sheathiana was first formally described in 1902 by William Fitzgerald in "Journal and Proceedings of the Royal Society of Western Australia". The specific epithet (sheathiana) is to honour Jeremiah Sheath, an early Superintendent of King's Park in Perth. The common name, boree or booree, is taken from the Noongar name for the plant.

Distribution and habitat
Boree occurs in and between the Lake Barlee, Lake Cronin and Rawlinna districts in the Coolgardie, Mallee and Murchison biogeographic regions where it grows in sandy, clayey or loamy soils on stony hillsides and dunes.

Conservation
Melaleuca sheathiana is classified as "not threatened" by the Government of Western Australia Department of Parks and Wildlife.

Uses

Horticulture
Boree is a useful shrub for hedges and windbreaks in temperate climates. It grows well in most well-drained soils and it is frost hardy.

Essential oils
The leaves of this species contain a number of essential oils, the most abundant being alpha-Pinene and 1,8-cineole (Eucalyptol).

References

sheathiana
Myrtales of Australia
Plants described in 1902
Endemic flora of Western Australia
Taxa named by William Vincent Fitzgerald